Inostranceviinae is an extinct subfamily of gorgonopsid therapsids that lived during the Late Permian. Only two genera are known, both from Russia.

References

Gorgonopsia
Prehistoric animal subfamilies
Therapsid subfamilies